Filip Krajinović was the defending champion but chose not to defend his title.

Bernabé Zapata Miralles won the title after defeating Daniel Elahi Galán 6–3, 6–4 in the final.

Seeds

Draw

Finals

Top half

Bottom half

References

External links
Main draw
Qualifying draw

Heilbronner Neckarcup - 1
2021 Singles